INS Leviathan may refer to one of the following submarines of the Israeli Sea Corps:

 , the former  submarine HMS Turpin (P354); acquired by the Israeli Sea Corps in 1965; scrapped in 1978

Israeli Navy ship names